Viitala is a Finnish surname. Notable people with the surname include:

Lennart Viitala (1921–1966), Finnish freestyle wrestler
Pihla Viitala (born 1982), Finnish actress
Walter Viitala (born 1992), Finnish footballer

Finnish-language surnames